The 2012–13 Mississippi State Bulldogs men's basketball team represent Mississippi State University in the 2012–13 college basketball season. The team's head coach is Rick Ray, in his first season at Mississippi State and overall. The team plays their home games at the Humphrey Coliseum in Starkville, Mississippi as a member of the Southeastern Conference.

Pre-season
The Bulldogs posted a record of 21–12 (8-8 SEC) in the 2011–12 season and finished sixth in the SEC standings. The Bulldogs lost all five starters and four other lettermen off of the previous team as well as replaced head coach Rick Stansbury after his thirteenth season.

Roster

Schedule

|-
!colspan=12| Exhibition

|-
!colspan=12| Non-Conference Regular Season

|-
!colspan=12| SEC Regular Season

|-
!colspan=12| 2013 SEC tournament

|-
| colspan="12" | *Non-Conference Game. Rankings from AP poll. All times are in Central Time. (#) Number seeded with region.
|}

References

Mississippi State
Mississippi State Bulldogs men's basketball seasons
Mississippi State Bulldogs basketball
Mississippi State Bulldogs basketball